Sumaryanto (born 1 March 1965) has been the rector of Yogyakarta State University since 2021. He is also known as a member of the joint independent fact-finding team formed by the President of the Republic of Indonesia, Joko Widodo, to help investigating the Kanjuruhan Stadium disaster.

Education 
 Doctor of philosophy (Gadjah Mada University, 2012)

Publications

Books 
 Aksiologi olahraga dalam perspektif pengembangan karakter bangsa (2022)
 Standar kompetensi guru pemula program studi pendidikan jasmani jenjang S1 (2004)
 Olahraga dalam perspektif mewujudkan kehidupan yang humanis (2014)

International publications 
 "Does the implementation of the management function have an impact on service quality? A study at the HSC fitness center" (International Journal of Human Movement and Sports Sciences 9 (5), 1019-1028)
 "Utilization of sport performance laboratory to identify health and physical condition of the fitness members" (International Journal Humanitarian Responsibilities, Education & Sport Sciences 1 (1) 1-6)

Footnotes 

Living people
1965 births
Indonesian Muslims
Yogyakarta State University
Academic staff of Yogyakarta State University